Wu Naiqun (born 4 February 1971) is a former Chinese basketball player who competed in the 1996 Summer Olympics.

References

1971 births
Living people
Basketball players from Liaoning
Chinese men's basketball players
Olympic basketball players of China
Basketball players at the 1996 Summer Olympics
Asian Games medalists in basketball
Asian Games gold medalists for China
Basketball players at the 1994 Asian Games
Liaoning Flying Leopards players
Medalists at the 1994 Asian Games
1994 FIBA World Championship players